The Burnelli UB-20 was a prototype lifting body airliner designed by Vincent Burnelli and built in the early 1930s.

Design and development
The UB-20 was a high-wing monoplane with a fixed tail wheel landing gear. It is considered the first American construction to have a load-bearing fuselage skin covered with smooth sheet metal. The fuselage structure consisted of seven transverse frames and four T-side members made of duralumin as well as stringers with a U-section. The wings had a structure consisting of two metal box spars with special drawn T-shaped angle connections. The tanks were in the wing root. The chassis and engine mounts were made from welded chrome-molybdenum steel tubes.

This allowed bulky loads to be transported as well as passengers. The passenger cabin was very comfortably furnished for this time. There were folding seats, a washroom and bunks for night flights. As with most other Burnelli aircraft, the engines were accessible in flight. The machine also had very good single-engine flight characteristics, so the flight altitude could be maintained even with a full payload. Similar to the Remington-Burnelli RB-2, which carried an automobile in the fuselage for advertising purposes, the UB-20 did so in 1934 by moving a Ford automobile under the fuselage between the legs on behalf of the Sun Oil Company.

Specifications (UB-20)

References 

Burnelli aircraft
1930s United States civil aircraft
Lifting bodies
High-wing aircraft
Aircraft first flown in 1930